Colin Fleming and Ken Skupski were the defending champions, but lost to Filip Polášek and Igor Zelenay in the first round.
Daniele Bracciali and Potito Starace won the final against Rohan Bopanna and Aisam-ul-Haq Qureshi 7–6(8–6), 7–6(7–5).

Seeds

Draw

Draw

External links
 Main Draw

St. Petersburg Open - Men's Doubles
St. Petersburg Open
2010 in Russian tennis